Joseph Roettiers (1635–1703) was a Flemish medallist active in England and France, and a member of the celebrated Roettier family of goldsmiths, silversmiths, and engravers.

Roettiers was the son of Philip Roettiers, brother of John Roettiers (1631–1703) and Philip Roettiers (1640–1718), and the father of Joseph-Charles Roettiers (1693–1779), all of whom were medallists whether in England or in France.

Roettiers served as assistant engraver at the British Royal Mint in the early 1670s, then went to France where he obtained the post of Engraver-general in 1682. He became graveur particulier at the Paris Mint from 1694 to 1703, and later Primier graveur de l’Histoire en Medailles, and was one of the first artists to contribute to Louis XIV's series of medals (begun in 1680), in collaboration with Jean Mauger, Henri Roussel, Michel Molart, and others.

1635 births
1703 deaths
17th-century engravers
18th-century engravers
French engravers
French medallists
French goldsmiths
French silversmiths